Liu Xizai (1813–1881) was a Chinese literati of the Qing Dynasty. He was regarded as the Hegel of the East.

Name variations 
Liu is the family name, or surname. His given name is Xizai. His courtesy name was Bójiǎn. He may also be known by the pseudonym (art name), Róngzhāi or Wùyázǐ.

Life 
The book, The Record of Xing Hua remains the primary source of bibliographical material on Liu Xizai. More sources include internal evidence from articles by or about Liu Xizai, and other sources.

In 1813, Liu Xizai was born in Xinghua, Jiangsu. When he was ten years old, his father died. Several years later, his mother also died. The young Xizai read extensively and engaged in studying. He made friends with Wō Rén and many other intelligent peers. In 1864, he served as a teacher in Guozijian and made great contributions. He finished his autobiography when he was very old. In 1881, he died at the age of 69.

Works 
Most of his works focus on criticizing literature. They are considered important to the development of Chinese culture.

Brief introduction of his major books 
 Generalization of Art
 It consists of six volumes (that is 文概, 诗概, 赋概, 词曲概, 书概, 经义概)
 Collections of Previous Mistakes
 Classification of Four Tunes

Influence 
Liu Xizai has had a great influence in China for his correct and outstanding appreciation of quantities of literature books or poem written by many famous people such as Du Fu, Wang Wei, Liu Yuxi and so on. He provided people with different perspectives to comment on traditional Chinese culture.

References

External links 
Stories of Liu Xizai
Former Residence of Liu Xizai
Students of Liu Xizai

Qing dynasty writers
Writers from Taizhou, Jiangsu
1813 births
1881 deaths
People from Xinghua, Jiangsu